KNCB is a radio station in Vivian, Louisiana. Broadcasting on 1320 AM, KNCB is owned by MLS Broadcasting Inc. It is the Shreveport-Texarkana radio home of the Texas Rangers.

History
KNCB was first licensed in 1966, to Alvis Dowd. The station originally operated at 1600 kHz. Upon his death, his widow Ruby June Stinnett Dowd (later Collins), operating as North Caddo Broadcasting, took over the station.

In 1976, KNCB moved to 1320 after trying in the early 1970s to move to 1300.

In 2012, the station was transferred to Gloria Dowd Herring and Ronald Dowd as co-administrators of Collins's estate. During this time, the KNCB stations encountered serious financial problems and requested to operate only on Sundays from 6am to 6pm. In 2014, the KNCB stations were sold to MLS Broadcasting, a business of the Delgiorno family.

On February 1, 2016, KNCB changed their format from sports to classic hits.  (info taken from stationintel.com)

External links
K-104 - 1320 Facebook

Radio stations established in 1966
Classic rock radio stations in the United States
Radio stations in Louisiana